The list that follows is the Liberal Democrats Frontbench Team/Shadow Cabinet led by Menzies Campbell from 2006 to 2007.

Initial team

Frontbench Team
Leader of the Liberal Democrats – Sir Menzies Campbell
 Lib Dem Deputy Leader and Lib Dem Shadow Chancellor of the Exchequer – Vincent Cable
 Lib Dem Shadow Secretary of State for Foreign and Commonwealth Affairs – Michael Moore
 Lib Dem Shadow Secretary of State for Health – Norman Lamb
 Lib Dem Shadow Secretary of State for the Home Department – Nick Clegg
 Lib Dem Shadow Secretary of State for Defence – Nick Harvey
 Lib Dem Shadow Secretary of State for Environment, Food and Rural Affairs – Chris Huhne
 Lib Dem Shadow Secretary of State for Transport – Susan Kramer
 Lib Dem Shadow Leader of the House of Commons and Party President – Simon Hughes
 Lib Dem Shadow Lord Chancellor, Secretary of State for Justice and Ministry of Justice – David Heath
 Lib Dem Shadow Secretary of State for Children, Schools and Families – David Laws
 Lib Dem Shadow Secretary of State for Innovation, Universities and Skills – Sarah Teather
 Lib Dem Shadow Secretary of State for Culture, Media and Sport – Don Foster
 Lib Dem Shadow Secretary of State for Communities and Local Government – Andrew Stunell
 Lib Dem Shadow Minister for Housing – Paul Holmes
 Lib Dem Shadow Secretary of State for Work and Pensions – Danny Alexander
 Lib Dem Shadow Secretary of State for Business, Enterprise and Regulatory Reform – Lembit Öpik
 Lib Dem Shadow Secretary of State for International Development – Lynne Featherstone
 Lib Dem Shadow Secretary of State for Northern Ireland and Secretary of State for Scotland – Alistair Carmichael
 Lib Dem Shadow Secretary of State for Wales – Roger Williams
 Lib Dem Shadow Minister for the Cabinet Office and Chancellor of the Duchy of Lancaster – Norman Baker
 Lib Dem Shadow Chief Secretary to the Treasury – Julia Goldsworthy
 Chief Whip – Paul Burstow
 Party Leader's Chief of Staff and Chair of Campaigns and Communications – Edward Davey
 Chair of the Manifesto Group – Steve Webb
 Parliamentary Private Secretary to the Leader – Tim Farron
 Chair of the Parliamentary Party – To be decided
 Leader of the Party in the House of Lords – The Lord McNally
 Lib Dem Shadow Attorney General – Martin Thomas
 Lib Dem Shadow Solicitor General – David Howarth

Other spokespeople
 Treasury – Colin Breed
 Foreign Affairs – Mark Hunter
 Home Affairs – Jeremy Browne, Tim Farron
 DEFRA Team – Martin Horwood (Environment), Roger Williams (Rural Affairs)
 Health – John Pugh, Sandra Gidley
 House of Commons – Sir Robert Smith
 Transport – John Leech
 Business, Enterprise and Regulatory Reform – Lorely Burt
 Women and Equality – Jo Swinson
 Defence – Bob Russell, Willie Rennie
 Work and Pensions – Paul Rowen
 Northern Ireland and Scotland – Alan Reid
 International Development – John Barrett
 Wales – Mark Williams
 Communities and Local Government – Jo Swinson, Tom Brake
 Culture, Media and Sport – Tom Brake, Dan Rogerson (Arts, Culture and Heritage), Richard Younger-Ross
 Children, Schools and Families – Annette Brooke
 Schools – Greg Mulholland
 Innovation, Universities and Skills – Evan Harris
 Deputy Whips – Adrian Sanders, Jenny Willott
 Chair of the Parliamentary Party – Paul Holmes
 London and the Olympics – Tom Brake
 Leader's Parliamentary Private Secretary – Tim Farron

Lords team
Liberal Democrat peers are also organised into teams broadly corresponding to the areas of Government departments.

 Leader in the House of Lords - The Lord McNally
 Deputy Leaders in the House of Lords and Home Affairs - The Lord Dholakia of Waltham Brooks
 Deputy Leaders in the House of Lords and Foreign Affairs - The Lord Wallace of Saltaire
 Chief Whip in the House of Lords - The Lord Shutt of Greetland
 Home Affairs - The Lord Dholakia of Waltham Brooks
 Health - The Baroness Barker
 Europe - The Lord Dykes
 Environment, Food and Rural Affairs - The Baroness Miller of Chilthorne Domer
 Northern Ireland - The Lord Smith of Clifton
 Trade and Industry - The Lord Razzall
 Transport - The Lord Bradshaw
 International Development - The Baroness Northover and The Lord Roberts of Llandudno
 Culture, Media and Sport - The Lord Clement-Jones and The Baroness Bonham-Carter of Yarnbury
 Shadow Lord Chancellor - The Lord Goodhart

2007 reshuffle

Frontbench Team
Leader of the Liberal Democrats - Sir Menzies Campbell
 Lib Dem Deputy Leader and Lib Dem Shadow Chancellor of the Exchequer - Vincent Cable
 Lib Dem Shadow Secretary of State for Foreign and Commonwealth Affairs - Michael Moore
 Lib Dem Shadow Secretary of State for Health - Norman Lamb
 Lib Dem Shadow Secretary of State for the Home Department - Nick Clegg
 Lib Dem Shadow Secretary of State for Defence - Nick Harvey
 Lib Dem Shadow Secretary of State for Environment, Food and Rural Affairs - Chris Huhne
 Lib Dem Shadow Secretary of State for Transport - Susan Kramer
 Lib Dem Shadow Leader of the House of Commons and Party President - Simon Hughes
 Lib Dem Shadow Lord Chancellor, Secretary of State for Justice and Ministry of Justice - David Heath
 Lib Dem Shadow Secretary of State for Children, Schools and Families - David Laws
 Lib Dem Shadow Secretary of State for Innovation, Universities and Skills - Sarah Teather
 Lib Dem Shadow Secretary of State for Culture, Media and Sport - Don Foster
 Lib Dem Shadow Secretary of State for Communities and Local Government - Andrew Stunell
 Lib Dem Shadow Minister for Housing - Paul Holmes
 Lib Dem Shadow Secretary of State for Work and Pensions - Danny Alexander
 Lib Dem Shadow Secretary of State for Business, Enterprise and Regulatory Reform - Lembit Öpik
 Lib Dem Shadow Secretary of State for International Development - Lynne Featherstone
 Lib Dem Shadow Secretary of State for Northern Ireland and Secretary of State for Scotland - Alistair Carmichael
 Lib Dem Shadow Secretary of State for Wales - Roger Williams
 Lib Dem Shadow Minister for the Cabinet Office and Chancellor of the Duchy of Lancaster - Norman Baker
 Lib Dem Shadow Chief Secretary to the Treasury - Julia Goldsworthy
 Chief Whip - Paul Burstow
 Party Leader's Chief of Staff and Chair of Campaigns and Communications - Edward Davey
 Chair of the Manifesto Group - Steve Webb
 Parliamentary Private Secretary to the Leader - Tim Farron
 Chair of the Parliamentary Party - To be decided
 Leader of the Party in the House of Lords - The Lord McNally
 Lib Dem Shadow Attorney General - Martin Thomas
 Lib Dem Shadow Solicitor General - David Howarth

Junior spokespeople
 Treasury - Colin Breed
 Foreign Affairs - Mark Hunter
 Home Affairs - Jeremy Browne, Tim Farron
 DEFRA Team - Martin Horwood (Environment), Roger Williams (Rural Affairs)
 Health - John Pugh, Sandra Gidley
 House of Commons - Sir Robert Smith
 Transport - John Leech
 Business, Enterprise and Regulatory Reform - Lorely Burt
 Women and Equality - Jo Swinson
 Defence - Bob Russell, Willie Rennie
 Work and Pensions - Paul Rowen
 Northern Ireland and Scotland - Alan Reid
 International Development - John Barrett
 Wales - Mark Williams
 Communities and Local Government - Jo Swinson, Tom Brake
 Culture, Media and Sport - Tom Brake, Dan Rogerson (Arts, Culture and Heritage), Richard Younger-Ross
 Children, Schools and Families - Annette Brooke
 Schools - Greg Mulholland
 Innovation, Universities and Skills - Evan Harris
 Deputy Whips - Adrian Sanders, Jenny Willott
 Chair of the Parliamentary Party - Paul Holmes
 London and the Olympics - Tom Brake
 Leader's Parliamentary Private Secretary - Tim Farron

Lords team
Liberal Democrat peers are also organised into teams broadly corresponding to the areas of Government departments.

 Leader in the House of Lords - The Lord McNally
 Deputy Leaders in the House of Lords and Foreign Affairs- The Lord Dholakia of Waltham Brooks and The Lord Wallace of Saltaire
 Chief Whip in the House of Lords - The Lord Shutt of Greetland
 Home Affairs - The Lord Dholakia of Waltham Brooks
 Health - The Baroness Barker
 Europe - The Lord Dykes
 Environment, Food and Rural Affairs - The Baroness Miller of Chilthorne Domer
 Northern Ireland - The Lord Smith of Clifton
 Trade and Industry - The Lord Razzall
 Transport - The Lord Bradshaw
 International Development - The Baroness Northover and The Lord Roberts of Llandudno
 Culture, Media and Sport - The Lord Clement-Jones and The Baroness Bonham-Carter of Yarnbury
 Shadow Lord Chancellor - The Lord Goodhart

References

Campbell
Politics of the United Kingdom
2000s in the United Kingdom
2006 establishments in the United Kingdom
2007 disestablishments in the United Kingdom
British shadow cabinets
2007 in British politics
2006 in British politics